Stéphane Edi Cueni (born 14 March 2001) is a Swiss professional footballer who plays as a midfielder for Swiss Challenge League club Wil, on loan from Swiss Super League club Lausanne-Sport.

Club career
On 13 January 2021, Cueni signed his first professional contract with Lausanne-Sport. He made his professional debut with the club in a 3–1 Swiss Super League loss to Basel on 4 February 2021.

On 4 August 2022, Cueni moved to Wil on a season-long loan.

International career
Born in Switzerland, Cueni is of Cape Verdean descent. He is a youth international for Switzerland.

References

External links
 
 SFL Profile
 Football.ch U16 Profile
 Football.ch U19 Profile
 Football.ch U20 Profile

2001 births
Sportspeople from Lausanne
Swiss people of Cape Verdean descent
Swiss sportspeople of African descent
Living people
Swiss men's footballers
Switzerland youth international footballers
Association football midfielders
FC Lausanne-Sport players
FC Stade Lausanne Ouchy players
FC Wil players
Swiss 1. Liga (football) players
Swiss Super League players
Swiss Challenge League players